Liz Kotz (born about 1961) is an American writer, art critic, curator and art historian based in Los Angeles.

Early life and education 
In 2000, Kotz completed her Ph.D. in comparative literature at Columbia University, working with Benjamin Buchlolh. Her dissertation was titled, Language Models in 1960s American Art: From Cage to Warhol.

Critical reception 
Jacqueline Baas commented on "the richness of information and interpretation contained in so much of Words to Be Looked At". Baas writes, "The book is organized into three sections, each focusing on a different disciplinary aspect of the relationship between language and art. The first two chapters deal with works related to music, the next two with poetry, and the last two with visual art."

Reviewing The New Fuck You, Ellen Krout-Hasegowa wrote it is "a collection of fiction and poetry by nearly 40 writers, and it thrills with all the excitement of a sticky-floored camy ride."

Selected publications

See also 
 Art criticism

References 

1961 births
Living people
American art critics
American art curators
American women curators
American art historians
Women art historians
American women writers
20th-century American women writers
21st-century American women writers
Writers from California